It was the first edition of the tournament.

Tatjana Maria won the title, defeating Irina-Camelia Begu in the final, 6–2, 6–2.

Seeds

Draw

Draw

References
Main Draw

Aegon Southsea Trophy - Singles
Southsea Trophy